This article presents a list of the historical events and publications of Australian literature during 2004.

Events
John Hay, Peter Porter, Elizabeth Webby, W. H. Wilde, and Barbara Ker Wilson are all recognised in the 2004 Australia Day Honours.
Peter Craven is sacked as editor of Quarterly Essay and the annual The Best Australian... anthologies after a dispute with Black Inc. publisher Morry Schwartz.
Kenneth Dutton, Nick Enright, Morag Fraser, David Myers, and Brenda Niall are recognised in the Queen's Birthday honours list.
Independent book publishers Text (Australia) and Canongate (UK) form a joint venture. The Text Media Group, purchased by John Fairfax earlier this year, sells Text Publishing to the joint venture partners.
Sydney Morning Herald Literary Editor, Malcolm Knox exposes Norma Khouri and her 'factual' account of honour killings in Jordan as a fabrication.
Mark Rubbo, David Marr and Kerryn Goldsworthy resign as Miles Franklin Award judges in protest at changes to the charter governing the award's administration.
 Inaugural Chief Minister's Northern Territory Book History Awards held

Major publications

Literary fiction

 Sarah Armstrong – Salt Rain
 Larissa Behrendt – Home
 Carmel Bird – Cape Grimm
 Steven Carroll – The Gift of Speed
 John Charalambous – Furies
 Bryce Courtenay – Brother Fish
 Sophie Cunningham – Geography
 Jack Dann – The Rebel: An Imagined Life of James Dean
 Nick Earls – The Thompson Gunner
 Susan Johnson – The Broken Book
 Gail Jones – Sixty Lights
 Stefan Laszczuk – The Goddamn Bus of Happiness 
 Amanda Lohrey – The Philosopher's Doll
 Colleen McCullough – Angel Puss
 Andrew McGahan – The White Earth
 Monica McInerney – The Alphabet Sisters
 Emily Maguire – Taming the Beast
 Steven Orr – Hill of Grace
 Eva Sallis – Fire Fire
 Nicholas Shakespeare – Snowleg
 Celestine Hitiura Vaite – Frangipani
 Gerard Windsor – I Have Kissed Your Lips
 Charlotte Wood – The Submerged Cathedral
 Arnold Zable – Scraps of Heaven

Children's and Young Adult fiction
 Joanna Baker – Devastation Road
 Michael Gerard Bauer – The Running Man
 Sherryl Clark – Farm Kid
 Joanne Crawford and Grace Fielding – A Home for Bilby
Anthony Eaton – Fireshadow
 Sonya Hartnett – The Silver Donkey
 Steven Herrick – By the River
Joanne Horniman – Secret Scribbled Notebooks
 Prue Mason – Camel Rider
 Garth Nix – Grim Tuesday
 Scott Westerfeld – So Yesterday

Crime
 Peter Corris – The Coast Road
 Colin Cotterill – The Coroner's Lunch
 Kathryn Fox – Malicious Intent
 Jane Goodall – The Walker
 Kerry Greenwood
 Earthly Delights
 Heavenly Pleasures
 Malcolm Knox – A Private Man
 Barry Maitland – No Trace
 Tara Moss – Covet 
 Tony Park – Far Horizon
 Steve J. Spears – Murder by Manuscript

Romance
 Christine Balint – Ophelia's Fan
 Catherine Jinks – Spinning Around
Stephanie Laurens – The Ideal Bride
Rachael Treasure – The Stockmen
 Lynne Wilding – Outback Sunset

Science Fiction and Fantasy
 John Brosnan – Mothership
 Jack Dann – The Rebel
 Marianne de Pierres – Nylon Angel
 Richard Harland – The Black Crusade
 Simon Haynes – Hal Spacejock: Just Desserts
 Liam Hearn – Brilliance of the Moon
 Margo Lanagan – Black Juice
 Glenda Larke – The Tainted
Maxine McArthur – Less than Human
 Sophie Masson – Snow, Fire, Sword
 Josephine Pennicott – A Fire in the Shell
 Cherry Wilder – The Wanderer
 Kim Wilkins – Brilliance of the Moon
 Sean Williams – The Crooked Letter

Drama
 Martin Flanagan – The Call
 Michael Gurr – Julia Three
 Debra Oswald – Mr Bailey's Minder
 Abe Pogos – Toby
Alana Valentine – Run Rabbit Run!
 David Williamson – Amigos

Poetry
 M. T. C. Cronin – 
 Luke Davies – Totem
 Sarah Day – The Ship
 Noel Rowe – Next to Nothing
 Dipti Saravanamuttu – The Colosseum
 Samuel Wagan Watson – Smoke Encrypted Whispers

Non-fiction
 Peter Carey – Wrong About Japan: A Father's Journey with His Son
 Graeme Davison with Sheryl Yelland – Car Wars: How the Car Won Our Hearts and Conquered Our Cities
 Sally Neighbour – In the Shadow of Swords: on the Trail of Terrorism from Afghanistan to Australia

Biographies
 Michael Ackland – Henry Handel Richardson: A Life
 Phillip Adams – Adam's Ark
 Gay Bilson – Plenty: Digressions on Food
 Max Brown – Charmian and George: The Marriage of George Johnston and Charmian Clift
 Don Chipp – Keep the Bastards Honest
 Michael Duffy – Latham and Abbott
Carolly Erikson – The Girl from Botany Bay: The True Story of Mary Broad and Her Extraordinary Escape
 Peter FitzSimons – Steve Waugh
 Tim Flannery – Country
 John Hughes – The Idea of Home: Autobiographical Essays
 John Marsden – I Am What I Am: My Life and Curious Times
 Siobhan O'Brien – A Life by Design: The Art and Lives of Florence Broadhurst
 Sue Pieters-Hawke and Hazel Flynn – Hazel's Journey: A Personal Experience of Alzheimer's
 Peter Roebuck – Sometimes I Forgot to Laugh
 Charles Tingwell – Bud: A Life
 Stevie Wright and Glenn Goldsmith – Hard Road: The Life and Times of Stevie Wright

Awards and honours
Note: these awards were presented in the year in question.

Lifetime achievement

Fiction

International

National

Children and Young Adult

National

Crime and Mystery

National

Science Fiction

Non-Fiction

Poetry

Drama

Deaths
 3 January – 
 Len Fox, journalist, historian, social activist and painter (born 1905) 
Barbara Jefferis, novelist and dramatist (born 1917)
 8 January – Norman Talbot, poet (born 1936)
 17 February – Bruce Beaver, poet (born 1928)
 11 April – Wilbur G. Howcroft, writer for children (born 1917)
 7 July – Elisabeth MacIntyre, writer for children (born 1916)
 17 August – Thea Astley, novelist (born 1925)
 8 November – Peter Mathers, novelist and short story writer (born 1931)

See also
 2004 in Australia
 2004 in literature
 2004 in poetry
 List of years in literature
 List of years in Australian literature
 List of Australian literary awards

References

Note: all references relating to awards can, or should be, found on the relevant award's page.

Australian literature by year
Literature
21st-century Australian literature
2004 in literature